Wei Yung (5 May 1936 – 3 March 2004) was a Taiwanese politician. He served as the Minister of the Research, Development and Evaluation Commission from 1976 to 1988 and represented Taipei in the Second Legislative Yuan.

References

External links

Taipei Members of the Legislative Yuan
1936 births
2004 deaths
Taiwanese people from Hubei
Members of the 2nd Legislative Yuan
Kuomintang Members of the Legislative Yuan in Taiwan
Politicians from Wuhan
Government ministers of Taiwan